Galatasaray Spor Kulübü (Galatasaray Sports Club), also known as Galatasaray AŞ in UEFA competitions, is a Turkish professional football club based on the European side of the city of Istanbul. It is the association football branch of the larger Galatasaray Sports Club of the same name, itself a part of the Galatasaray Community Cooperation Committee which includes Galatasaray High School where the football club was founded in October 1905 consisting entirely of student members. The team traditionally play in dark shades of red and yellow at home, with the shirts split down the middle between the two colours. Galatasaray is the most successful Turkish football club in history.

Galatasaray is one of three teams to have participated in all seasons of the Süper Lig since 1959, following the dissolution of the Istanbul Football League.

Galatasaray also has accumulated the most Süper Lig (22), Turkish Cup (18) and Turkish Super Cup (16) titles in Turkey, thus making them the most decorated football club in Turkey, as those competitions are the top nationwide Turkish professional leagues and cups that are recognized and accounted for in accordance to the regulations set by the Turkish Football Federation and UEFA.

Internationally, Galatasaray has won the UEFA Cup and UEFA Super Cup in 2000, becoming the first and only Turkish team to win a major UEFA competition. They have also won the Emirates cup in 2013 in London. In the 1999–2000 season, the club achieved the rare feat of completing a treble by winning the Süper Lig, the Turkish Cup, and the UEFA Cup in a single season. Galatasaray is also the only Turkish club to have been ranked first on the IFFHS World Rankings. According to the same international organization, Galatasaray is the best Turkish club of the 20th century, and the 60th most successful club in Europe.

Since 2011, the club's stadium is the 52,280-capacity Nef Stadium in Seyrantepe, Istanbul. Previously, the club played at the Ali Sami Yen Stadium, as well as a succession of other grounds in Istanbul, which included groundshares with Beşiktaş and Fenerbahçe at the Taksim Stadium and İnönü Stadium.

As a result of the team's 20th championship for the 2014–15 Süper Lig season, their crest hereafter contains four stars representing their 20 championships for the league; each star corresponds to five of the team's championships. Making them the first and only Turkish club to have achieved such a feat, thereby officially being the club with most stars on their logo in Turkey.

The club has a long-standing rivalry with Istanbul teams, namely with Beşiktaş and Fenerbahçe. The derby between Galatasaray and Fenerbahçe is dubbed the Kıtalar Arası Derbi due to the location of their headquarters and stadiums on the European (Galatasaray) and Asian (Fenerbahçe) sides of the Bosphorus strait in Istanbul.

History

Galatasaray SK was founded in October 1905 (the exact day is disputed, but is traditionally accepted as "17 Teşrinievvel 1321" according to the Rumi calendar, which corresponds to "30 October 1905" according to the Gregorian calendar) by Ali Sami Yen and other students of Galatasaray High School (a high school in Istanbul which was established in 1481) as a football club. Ali Sami Yen became Galatasaray SK's first president and was given the club's membership number "1". The team's first match was against Cadi-Keuy FC and Galatasaray won this match with a score of 2–0. There were discussions about the club's name, in which some suggested Gloria (victory) and others Audace (courage), but it was decided that its name would be Galatasaray.

In addition to Ali Sami Yen (Club member No. 1), who was the driving force behind the club's foundation, Asim Tevfik Sonumut (2), Emin Bülent Serdaroğlu (3), Celal İbrahim (4), Boris Nikolov (5), Milo Bakić (6), Pavle Bakić (7), Bekir Sıtkı Bircan (8), Tahsin Nihat (9), Reşat Şirvanizade (10), Hüseyin Hüsnü (11), Refik Cevdet Kalpakçıoğlu (12) and Abidin Daver (13) were also involved in the decision to organize such a club.

The name Galatasaray itself comes from that of Galatasaray High School, which in turn takes its name from Galata Sarayı Enderûn-u Hümâyûn (Galata Palace Imperial School), the name of the original school founded on the site in 1481, and which in turn took its name from the nearby medieval Genoese citadel of Galata (the modern quarter of Karaköy) in the Beyoğlu (Pera) district of Istanbul. Galatasaray literally means "Galata palace".

According to researcher Cem Atabeyoğlu, Galatasaray took its name from one of its first matches. In that match, Galatasaray won 2–0 over a local Greek club, and the spectators called them "Galata Sarayı efendileri" (English: "Gentlemen of Galata Palace"), and, after this incident, they adopted that name and started to call their club "Galata Sarayı". In 1905, during the era of the Ottoman Empire, there were no laws for associations so the club could not be registered officially, but, after the 1912 Law of Association, the club registered legally.

Since there weren't any other Turkish teams, Galatasaray joined the Istanbul League that was consisting of English and Greek teams in the season of 1905–1906. With their first championship title they won in 1908–1909, they heralded the beginning of Turkish football history.

While football in Turkey began to fully develop, Galatasaray won ten more Istanbul League titles until 1952. Upon the initiation of professional football in 1952, the first professional but non-national league of Turkey, Istanbul Professional League, was played between 1952 and 1959. Galatasaray won three of these seven titles.

Türkiye Profesyonel 1. Ligi (Turkish Super League today) formed in 1959. This is the top-flight professional league in Turkish nationwide football, and the most popular sporting competition in the country. Galatasaray joined all seasons and won 22 league titles since then.

The Turkish Football Federation began organizing the Turkish Cup (today it is organized with the name Ziraat Turkish Cup) in the 1962–63 season for Turkish clubs to qualify for the UEFA competitions. This is the only national cup competition in Turkey. Galatasaray joined all seasons and won 16 trophies since then.

Probably the greatest record that the club holds is winning national championships in 15 different sport branches in the 1986–87 season. Another achievement in this period was reaching the semi-final of the European Cup in the 1988–89 season, making Galatasaray the first and only Turkish team to have played a semi-final in this competition.

Galatasaray's most successful era came in the late 1990s, when the club become the first and only Turkish football club to win a major UEFA competition. They were aided in this by one of Turkey's best generation of homegrown footballers who went on to finish third in the 2002 FIFA World Cup, after having played in the quarter-finals of UEFA Euro 2000. Besides the talented players, visiting teams also disliked traveling into Ali Sami Yen Stadium, literally dubbed "Hell" by Galatasaray supporters due to the intimidating atmosphere provided by the fans including chants and riots in the crowds.

There are many successful footballers who have played for Galatasaray and made their mark on Turkish football history. The team's legendary players include Nihat Bekdik nicknamed Aslan (Lion); the 1930s national hero Eşfak Aykaç; Boduri who died aged 21; Mehmet Leblebi who scored a domestic record of 14 goals in a single match; Gündüz Kılıç nicknamed Baba (Father) who was the coach but also the player of his team in the 1950s, with great success in both duties; Bülent-Reha Eken brothers; Suat Mamat who scored three goals in the 1954 FIFA World Cup; Coşkun Özarı who devoted his life to Galatasaray; Turgay Şeren the heroic goalkeeper who was called "the Panther of Berlin"; Fatih Terim, the team captain of Galatasaray and Turkish national football team for many years, who won the UEFA Cup in 2000 as the team's coach; Metin Oktay the legendary six-time top-scorer of the Turkish Super League; Zoran Simović, another skilled goalkeeper known for his penalty saves; Cüneyt Tanman who played a record of 342 games for Galatasaray; Tanju Çolak, an extraordinary goalscorer and the 1988 European Golden Boot winner with Galatasaray; Cevad Prekazi, an Albanian teammate of Tanju Çolak specializing in free kicks; Cláudio Taffarel the World Cup-winning goalkeeper for Brazil; Gheorghe Hagi, the Romanian football hero who is still described by some as the best foreign player ever to play in Turkey; Brazilian striker Mário Jardel, dubbed "Super Mário" by the fans and scored both of Galatasaray's two goals in the 2000 European Super Cup Final against Real Madrid; and last, but not least, Hakan Şükür, the player who scored most goals in Süper Lig history with 249.

Name and pronunciation
Galatasaray is a quarter in Karaköy in the Beyoğlu district of Istanbul, located at the northern shore of the Golden Horn. Its name comes from that of Galata, which may in turn have derived from Galatai (meaning the "Galatians"), as the Celtic tribes were thought to have camped at Galata during the Hellenistic period before settling in Galatia in central Anatolia. Galatasaray translates directly as "Galata Palace" (saray means "palace" in Persian). Galatasaray High School, established in the area in 1481, was the progenitor of Galatasaray S.K. as well as other institutions of Galatasaray Community.

Galatasaray is a compound word and is pronounced as such, with a very brief pause between the two words. There is no diminutive form of the club's name. Fans refer to the club either by its full name or by its nickname Cim-Bom(-Bom),)—of uncertain etymology.  However, the shortened form "Gala" is sometimes used by English speakers.

Crest and colours

Galatasaray's first emblem was drawn by 333 [School Number] Şevki Ege. This was the figure of a spread-winged eagle with a football in its beak. The eagle was a model emblem that Galatasaray dwelled on in the beginning. But when the name did not attract too much interest, Şevki Ege's composition was pushed aside. It was replaced by the current design in the 1920s. This replaced in 1925 by the current "Ghayn-Sin" crest, which are the first two Arabic letters of "G"alata "S"aray, designed by Ayetullah Emin.

At first, the colours of Galatasaray were red and white. These are the colours in the modern Turkish flag. The Turkish Republic, however, was not founded at that time. Therefore, this decision caused the repressive administration of the day to feel uncomfortable and the administration subsequently pressured the footballers. For this reason, on December 26, 1906, the colors were changed to yellow and black. The eight-piece halved design kit was ordered from the Sports Outfitter William Shillcock based in Birmingham, United Kingdom. After a heavy 0-5 loss to Baltalimanı in a friendly match the new colours yellow and black were counted as inauspicious.

On 6 December 1908, for a match against the football team of the Royal Navy cruiser , Galatasaray finally settled on playing in red and yellow, inspired by the roses which Gül Baba offered to Sultan Bayezid II. 
Ali Sami Yen stated, "After we have been in and out of several shops, we saw two different elegant-looking wool materials in Fatty Yanko's store at Bahçekapısı (between Eminönü and Sirkeci in Istanbul, now called Bahçekapı). One of them was quite dark red, resembling the cherry color, and the other a rich yellow with a touch of orange. When the sales clerk made the two fabrics fly together with a twist of his hand they became so bright that it reminded us the beauty of a goldfinch. We thought we were looking at the colors flickering in burning fire. We were picturing the yellow-red flames shining on our team and dreaming that it would take us to victories. Indeed it did."

Home kit

The Galatasaray home kit have always been fundamentally the same since 1908. The traditional shirt of Galatasaray is the eight-piece halved design. This consists of the shirt’s front, back and sleeves being made up of two colours, resulting in the shirt being split into eight parts. (Two same colours are never next to each other within the 8 parts.) The colours continue in an alternating order, from yellow to red. This results in the front of the shirt being the opposite of the back and the shirt also having an halved design from the side. This alternating colour order of eight parts creates a complete halved design for the shirt.
The classic eight-piece halved design would become the look of Galatasaray for around 80 years, until 1985 when sportswear manufacturer Adidas began to provide the shirts and the sleeves were made up by one colour and not halved. 
Created over a century ago, the classic Galatasaray kit combination consists of the eight-piece halved traditional shirt, white shorts and red socks and are usually worn as part of the home strip. This changed in the mid-1980s, when sportswear manufacturer Adidas began to provide the shirts. The club reverted to the "classic" kit in 2012. The official colours are Pantone shades 1235 (yellow) and 201 (red).

Kit history

Kit suppliers and shirt sponsors
Galatasaray's kit is manufactured by Nike, who have held the contract since 2011. Previous kit manufacturers have been: Çamlıca (1978–79); Adidas (1978–82, 1984–91, 1995–2001, and 2005–11); Umbro (1979–81, 1982–83, 1991–95, and 2002–05); Puma (1980–81); Gola (1981–82); Fatih (1984–85); and Lotto (2001–02).

Since 2020, Galatasaray's shirt sponsors have been Sixt. Previous sponsors include: Volvo and PeReJa (1977–78); Halı Fleks (1979–80); Telefunken, Alo, and THY (1980–81); Borsaş and Meban (1981–83); Telefunken (1983–84); Modell's (1984–85); Denizbank (1984–86); TürkBank (1986–91); ADEC Saat (1991–92); SHOW TV (1991–95); Emek Sigorta (1992–95); VakıfBank (1995–97); Bank Ekspres (1997–98); Marshall (1998–2000); Telsim (2000–01); Aria (2001–04); Avea (2004–09); Türk Telekom (2009–14); Huawei (2014–15), Dumankaya (2015–16), UNDP (2016), Nef (2016–19),  Terra Pizza (2019–20) and Sixt (2020–) for domestic matches and since 2014 for international matches Turkish Airlines.

Grounds

Ali Sami Yen Stadium
When Galatasaray were formed no Turkish teams had their own home ground, and all games in the Istanbul Football League took place at Papazın Çayırı – now the site of Fenerbahçe's Şükrü Saracoğlu Stadium. In 1921 the city's first proper football stadium was constructed, Taksim Stadium, which was used as the home ground for all of Istanbul's teams. When historic Taksim Stadium was demolished in 1940, Galatasaray decided to build a large, modern stadium. Due to difficulties stemming from World War II, construction was delayed for over two decades. In this period, they played in Şeref Stadi and Dolmabahçe Stadi
On 20 December 1964, Ali Sami Yen Stadium opened. Named after the founder of Galatasaray, Ali Sami Yen, it is in the Mecidiyeköy quarter of the Şişli district at the center of the city. In 1964, the stadium had capacity over 35,000. Due to improvements in security and prohibition of non-seater spectators, the all-seater capacity reduced to 22,000 in 1993. A few years later, the rebuilt of main stand, which was damaged by an earthquake, slightly increased the capacity.
After 2002, when Atatürk Olympic Stadium was built for Istanbul's Olympic Games bid, Galatasaray started to play European Cup matches there. The attendance record among Turkish stadiums was broken there, in Galatasaray–Olympiacos match played in front of 79,414 spectators. Yet, Ali Sami Yen Stadium has historic importance for Galatasaray fans although it is smaller and older.
The stadium was in 2011 demolished after Galatsaray moved to the newly built Nef Stadium.

Nef Stadium

The new home ground of Galatasaray is the newly built Nef Stadium in the Seyrantepe area of Sarıyer. It is also known as Ali Samiyen Spor Kompleksi. The new stadium, which was opened 15 January 2011, has a capacity of 52,280 seats, making it the largest private stadium used by a club in Turkey.

Stadium anthems
Since 1992, after every goal scored by Galatasaray, the last part of the song "I Will Survive" by the Hermes House Band is played. Although the song is in English, the part used has no lyrics except "la la la la". In addition, before every game the Galatasaray War Chant is played accompanied by what the fans call a "scarf show" where fans display and wave their Galatasaray scarves, banners and flags. Many people call the Turk Telekom Stadium 'Cehennem' (hell) because of stadium anthems and the continuous roar of the fans.

Stadium history

Support

European matches

Galatasaray fans attach high importance to European competitions, and Galatasaray is known as the Conqueror of Europe by their fans. This nickname underlines the importance of the UEFA Cup and Super Cup Galatasaray managed to win during the 1999–2000 season. Galatasaray fans also have a reputation in Europe as being one of the most fanatic in the world, along with ultrAslan. Ryan Giggs once said I've never experienced anything like Galatasaray. Three hours before kick-off, we went out to have a look at the pitch and the stadium was overcrowded! The chanting was brilliant: one side starts, then the other, then quiet, then all of them chanting! The players really enjoyed it. Before it was good, after it wasn't for us.'

Records
Galatasaray fans broke the "loudest crowd roar at a sport stadium" record on 18 March 2011 at Galatasaray's new stadium Türk Telekom Stadium in Istanbul. A peak reading of 140.76 dBA was recorded.

On March 11, 2023, Galatasaray broke the longest winning streak record (14) in Turkish Süper Lig history with a 1-0 win over Kasımpaşa.

Popularity of Galatasaray in Turkey
The poll in June 2012 placed Galatasaray in the first place with a 41.8% level of popularity while Fenerbahçe S.K. comes second with a 35.9% level, Beşiktaş J.K. third with 16.3% and Trabzonspor fourth with 4.7%. The same result was announced in another poll dated September 2019 which included a sample of 7500 Turkish people.

Istanbul derbies

"The big three" clubs of Istanbul – Beşiktaş, Fenerbahçe and Galatasaray – have a century-long history of rivalry. The Galatasaray–Fenerbahçe rivalry is the primary Istanbul derby and the most important rivalry in Turkish football. The rivalry poses a symbolic importance to supporters due to an assumed superiority that comes with winning the derby. Supporters are often quoted as stating that winning the league without winning the derby is hollow. There is always huge interest in the derby due to its fierce nature on and off the pitch. Many documentaries have been made about the derby including an episode of The Real Football Factories International. The rivalry has led to violence among supporters on numerous occasions, though this has been on the decline in recent years. The typical features of derby days include sell out stadiums, loud support throughout the match and taunting choreography displays by supporters before kick off. Other top level İstanbul derbies include the teams; İstanbul BB and Kasımpaşa although these teams pose a minor rivalry as the history and the nationwide attention to the derbies among the big three is unmatched.

Torches, smoke, drums, flags and giant posters are used to create visual grandeur and apply psychological pressure on visiting teams, which fans call "welcoming them to hell".

Honours

Domestic competitions
 Süper Lig
 Winners (22) (record): 1961–62, 1962–63, 1968–69, 1970–71, 1971–72, 1972–73, 1986–87, 1987–88, 1992–93, 1993–94, 1996–97, 1997–98, 1998–99, 1999–2000, 2001–02, 2005–06, 2007–08, 2011–12, 2012–13, 2014–15, 2017–18, 2018–19
 Runners-up (11): 1959, 1960–61, 1965–66, 1974–75, 1978–79, 1985–86, 1990–91, 2000–01, 2002–03, 2013–14, 2020–21
 Turkish Cup
 Winners (18) (record): 1962–63, 1963–64, 1964–65, 1965–66, 1972–73, 1975–76, 1981–82, 1984–85, 1990–91, 1992–93, 1995–96, 1998–99, 1999–2000, 2004–05, 2013–14, 2014–15, 2015–16, 2018–19
 Runners-up (5): 1968–69, 1979–80, 1993–94, 1994–95, 1997–98
 Turkish Super Cup
 Winners (16) (record): 1966, 1969, 1972, 1982, 1987, 1988, 1991, 1993, 1996, 1997, 2008, 2012, 2013, 2015, 2016, 2019 
 Runners-up (9): 1971, 1973, 1976, 1985, 1994, 1998, 2006, 2014, 2018
 Turkish National Division
 Winners (1): 1939
 Runners-up (5): 1937, 1940, 1941, 1943, 1950
 Turkish Football Championship
 Runners-up (1): 1949
 Atatürk Cup
 Runners-up (1): 2000
 Prime Minister's Cup
 Winners (5): 1975, 1979, 1986, 1990, 1995
 Runners-up (2): 1980, 1989

International competitions

 UEFA Cup
 Winners (1): 1999–2000
 UEFA Super Cup
 Winners (1): 2000

Regional competitions
 Istanbul Football League
 Winners (15): 1908–09, 1909–10, 1910–11, 1914–15, 1915–16, 1921–22, 1924–25, 1925–26, 1926–27, 1928–29, 1930–31, 1948–49, 1954–55, 1955–56, 1957–58
 Istanbul Football Cup 
 Winners (2): 1941–42, 1942–43 (shared-record)
 Istanbul Shield
 Winners (1): 1932–33

Doubles and Trebles
Doubles
Süper Lig and Turkish Cup: 1962–63, 1972–73, 1998–99, 2014–15
Domestic trebles
Süper Lig, Turkish Cup and TFF Super Cup: 1992–93, 2018–19
International trebles
Süper Lig, Turkish Cup and UEFA Europa League: 1999–2000

Other
 Turkish Amateur Football Championship
 Winners (1): 1952
 TSYD Cup
 Winners (12): 1963, 1966, 1967, 1970, 1977, 1981, 1987, 1991, 1992, 1997, 1998, 1999 (shared-record)
 Runners-up (9): 1965, 1969, 1971, 1973, 1976, 1979, 1980, 1986, 1991
 Atatürk Gazi Cup
 Winners (1): 1928
 50. Anniversary Cup 
 Winners (1): 1973
 Emirates Cup
 Winners (1): 2013
 Uhrencup
 Winners (1): 2016
 Union Club Cup 
 Winners (1): 1909

Players

Current squad

Academy players with first team shirt numbers

Out on loan

Reserves and Academy squad

Former players

Club captains

Coaching staff

Technical staff

Presidents

Club officials
Football Management Trade I.C.

Coaching history

Recent seasons

Youth facilities
Galatasaray has one of the most successful youth facilities in Turkey. Gündüz Kılıç Youth Facilities in Florya is the center of the department. Galatasaray U21 have won the Turkish Youth League three times.

Galatasaray football academy trains children between seven and fifteen. They are located in 79 sites, in Turkey, Australia, Germany, Belgium and the UK.

Sponsorship
Companies that Galatasaray S.K. currently has sponsorship deals with include:

References

Further reading
 Birand, M. A., & Polat, M. M. (2006). Passion that continues for 100 years. İstanbul: D Yapım. 
 Turagay, U., Özgün, G., Gökçin, B., Ahunbay (2006). 17 May: The story of a championship. İstanbul: D Yapım. 
 Hasol, D. (2004). Dreams/realities in Galatasaray. İstanbul: Yapı Yayın. 
 Tuncay, B. (2003). Galatasaray with European Success and Notable Players.  Yapı Kredi Kü̈ltü̈r Sanat Yayıncılık. 
 Yamak, O. (2001). Galatasaray: Story of 95 years. Sinerji. 
 Çakar, A. (1995). 90 questions about history of Galatasaray SK. Cağaloğlu, İstanbul: Demir Ajans Yayınları. 
 Tekil, S. (1986). History of Galatasaray, 1905–1985. Galatasaray Spor Kulübü. 
 Tekil, S. (1983). Galatasaray 1905–1982: Memories. Arset Matbaacılık Koll. Şti. 
 İsfendiyar, F. (1952). History of Galatasaray. İstanbul: Doğan Kardeş yayınları.

External links

Galatasaray Sports Club official website 
ultrAslan Supporters' Group 

 
 
1905 establishments in the Ottoman Empire
Association football clubs established in 1905
Football clubs in Istanbul
Unrelegated association football clubs
UEFA Cup winning clubs
UEFA Super Cup winning clubs
Süper Lig clubs
Sports teams in Istanbul